Phyllotrema is a genus of trematodes in the family Opecoelidae.

Species
Phyllotrema bicaudatum Yamaguti, 1934
Phyllotrema guangxiense Li, Qiu & Liang, 1990
Phyllotrema microrchis Jin, Zhang & Ji, 1979
Phyllotrema quadricaudatum Gu & Shen, 1979
Phyllotrema tetracaudatum Hussain, Rao & Shyamasundari, 1986

References

Opecoelidae
Plagiorchiida genera